José Alejandro Cambil (born 26 January 1975) is a Spanish race walker.

Achievements

References

1975 births
Living people
Spanish male racewalkers
World Athletics Championships athletes for Spain
Mediterranean Games silver medalists for Spain
Mediterranean Games medalists in athletics
Athletes (track and field) at the 2001 Mediterranean Games
20th-century Spanish people
21st-century Spanish people